The Divisiones Regionales de Fútbol in the Valencian Community, are organized by the Valencian Football Federation (FFCV):
Regional Preferente (Level 6 of the Spanish football pyramid)
Primera Regional (Level 7)
Segunda Regional (Level 8)

League chronology
Timeline

Regional Preferente

The Regional Preferente de la Comunitat Valenciana is one of the lower levels of the Spanish Football League. It is held every year. It stands at the sixth level of Spanish football with teams five promotions away from the top division. Teams from this league progress into the Tercera División RFEF Group 6. The participating teams are based in the Valencian Community.

The League 
The league consists of four regional groups of 18 teams each. Group 1 consists of teams in the province of Castellon and the northern part of Valencia province, Group 2 teams in the city of Valencia and surrounding satellite towns, Group 3 teams in the south of Valencia province and north of Alicante province and Group 4 teams the rest of Alicante province.

Promotion & Relegation
The top three teams of each group advance to the promotional playoffs. The twelve teams are paired into four playoff groups. The six winners are drawn into three more groups with the three winners being promoted to Tercera División RFEF – Group 6. The bottom three teams (16th-18th) in each group are relegated to the Primera Regional de la Comunitat Valenciana, which consists of seven regional groups.

Proposed changes
On 4 October 2022 the FFCV suggested creating a new level, provisionally titled Primera FFCV, to better bridge the gap between the Regional Preferente and Tercera Federación consisting of one or two divisions of 16 teams to begin for either the 2023/24 or 2024/25 seasons.

2022–23 season teams

Champions

Primera Regional

Primera Regional de la Comunidad Valenciana  is the seventh level of competition of the Spanish Football League in the Valencian Community. For the 2022/23 season, it is played in 8 regional groups of 16 teams each. At the end of the season, The champions and four winners of playoffs are promoted. Four clubs from each group are relegated to Segunda Regional.

Segunda Regional

Segunda Regional de la Comunidad Valenciana  is the eighth level of competition of the Spanish Football League in the Valencian Community. It is played with 16 groups of 16 to 18 clubs. At the end of the season, the champions and the best runners-up are promoted.

References

External links
Federación de Fútbol de la Comunidad Valenciana

Football in the Valencian Community
Divisiones Regionales de Fútbol